Peter Anok Kabeni is a Sudanese boxer. He competed in the men's bantamweight event at the 1988 Summer Olympics.

References

External links
 

Year of birth missing (living people)
Living people
Bantamweight boxers
Sudanese male boxers
Olympic boxers of Sudan
Boxers at the 1988 Summer Olympics
Place of birth missing (living people)